Abdul Shakoor (born 21 March 1988) is a cricketer who played for the United Arab Emirates national cricket team. He made his Twenty20 International debut against Scotland in the 2015 ICC World Twenty20 Qualifier tournament on 9 July 2015. He made his One Day International debut against Hong Kong in the 2015–17 ICC World Cricket League Championship on 16 November 2015.

In August 2018, he was named in the United Arab Emirates' squad for the 2018 Asia Cup Qualifier tournament.

He played for the Maratha Arabians in the opening game of the 2021 T10 League in Abu Dhabi, winning the power hitter and player of the match awards. He opened the batting and top scored with 73 runs from 28 balls, his first fifty runs coming from only 14 balls.

Shakoor was born and raised in Sharjah. His father moved to the UAE from Pakistan to work for the Sharjah Electricity and Water Authority.

References

External links
 

1988 births
Living people
Emirati cricketers
United Arab Emirates One Day International cricketers
United Arab Emirates Twenty20 International cricketers
People from the Emirate of Sharjah
Pakistani expatriate sportspeople in the United Arab Emirates